Mahoras Brook is an approximately  long spring-fed tributary of Waackaack Creek that flows through Monmouth County, New Jersey. The creek flows under Holland Road and runs north in a small, forested swale through a dominantly residential area, roughly paralleling Laurel Avenue (County Route 52), and receives a small tributary on the left bank.

See also
List of rivers of New Jersey

References

Rivers of New Jersey
Rivers of Monmouth County, New Jersey